Bamberg-Ehrhardt High School is a senior high school in Bamberg, South Carolina. It is a part of Bamberg School District One.

Athletics

State championships 
 Baseball: 1974, 1975, 1976, 1977, 1978, 1979, 1980, 1981, 1986, 1992, 1994, 1995, 2007, 2008, 2009
 Basketball - Boys: 1971
 Football: 
 Golf - Boys: 1977, 2005
 Softball: 2022
 Wrestling: 2011, 2012, 2013, 2018, 2019, 2020

Alumni
Zack Godley, professional baseball player
Mookie Wilson, professional baseball player
Preston Wilson, professional baseball player

References

External links
 Bamberg-Ehrhardt High School

Education in Bamberg County, South Carolina
Public high schools in South Carolina